Pete Lyman is a mastering engineer, and owner of Infrasonic Mastering, an audio and vinyl mastering studio with locations in Nashville, Tennessee, Los Angeles, California, and Oakland, California. He has mastered Grammy-award-winning and Grammy-nominated albums for Chris Stapleton, Tanya Tucker, Jason Isbell, Brandi Carlile, Sturgill Simpson, John Prine, Weezer, Panic! At the Disco, and more.  Lyman's music career began at the age of 14, playing bass in a number of bands, and sharing the stage with a variety of bands including My Bloody Valentine, The Mars Volta, and Sebadoh.

In 2012, Lyman opened Infrasonic Los Angeles, a custom-built mastering facility in Echo Park. He has since opened additional studio facilities in Nashville, TN and Oakland, CA. Infrasonic Nashville is now home to Pete's custom mastering suite, and his 1956 Neumann AM-32B lathe.

Discography 
The selected mastering and remastering discography for Pete Lyman is as follows:

References 

Living people
Year of birth missing (living people)
American audio engineers
21st-century American engineers